Eliezer Adler (1866-1949) was one of the founders of the Jewish community in Gateshead, England.

Biography

Adler was born on 30 August 1866 in what is now Ivano-Frankivsk, Ukraine, then known as Stanisławówin in Galicia, then part of the Austrian Empire. Adler's parents were Yehuda Yona Hass and Chayale (nee Adler) Hass and he was probably registered as Adler because his parents were not civilly married. Adler arrived in Liverpool, England in 1882 at the age of 15 looking for a better way to financially support himself and his widowed mother.

Adler moved to Newcastle upon Tyne and when his mother died, he needed a minyan to say Kaddish. Being that the Newcastle synagogues were not up to his religious standard, Adler crossed the bridge to Gateshead for the services. This led to the establishment of the "Shomrei Shabbos" synagogue in 1887. From that beginning the Gateshead Jewish community went on to establish a cheder in 1912, the Gateshead Talmudical College in 1929, 'Gateshead Kollel  in 1941 and the Jewish Teachers' Training College in 1944; institutions that thrive to this day.

"Eliezer Adler ... was to become the most prominent figure in the infant community, for he possessed a forceful personality, and a flair for organization. With his arrival "Jewish Gateshead" began to expand". 
In honour of his historical importance, his seat in the Gateshead synagogue remains vacant.

Adler married Sarah Rosenthal Doyschen and together they had 10 children. He was self employed as a hawker selling jewellery  and later as a furniture dealer. Adler died on 16 January 1949 (15 Tevet) while living with his daughter in Manchester and is buried in Rainsough Jewish cemetery in Manchester.

References

 

1866 births
1949 deaths
People from Ivano-Frankivsk
People from the Kingdom of Galicia and Lodomeria
Ukrainian Jews
Jews from Galicia (Eastern Europe)
English Jews